LAS Magazine, also known as Lost At Sea or LostAtSea.net, is a daily online magazine founded in 1998 by Eric J Herboth. An online social group for the magazine list it in the "Entertainment & Arts - Online Media" category with a description of "Art. Bike. Music. Media. Literature. Photography. Travel. Comics. Festivals. Sports? Yeah, a bit of that, too. Updated whenever, forever, since 1998." The magazine includes writing and photography contributions from Canada, Mexico, the United States, England, Scotland, Spain, Portugal, Germany, Switzerland, France, South Africa, Australia, Japan, New Zealand and Washington DC, but the publication maintains no fixed office.

The magazine began as a monthly publication with early articles on the artists and sculptors Christo and Jeanne-Claude, the media company Insound, neo-fascist Austrian politician Jörg Haider, the rock band Frodus, reviews of books by David Guterson and Stuart O'Nan and photo series by Dutch artist André Thijssen. The program was mixed early on, anthologized and augmented with a short series of book form magazines collecting articles from the website with pieces of artwork, found laminates and collages assembled in the zine fashion with long-reach staplers, binding glue and posterboard. Fewer than 50 copies were made.

In 2000 the magazine was "honored in the rock sites category for being, well, a cool resource and concise resource for indie music news" with a WoodEe award for online excellence from Tim McMahan of Lazy-i Magazine. That year the magazine evolved into a more regular endeavor with a gradual increase to weekly updates and then to a daily publishing schedule with short pieces of journalism, criticism, commentary, and personal essays.

A "news" section featured on the front page of the site includes short notes and links to articles on the web. Music reviews are published regularly by a staff of contributors and freelancers and according to a 2009 poll on the site's website account for 56% of reader interest. The main page of the site is also regularly updated with an MP3 Downloads section and a MultiMediaBox posting links to videos and mixtape downloads.

A monthly column of hip-hop music notes and commentary called "Glaciers of Ice" has been written by Jonah Flicker since 2005. Another music column called "EPmd (No relation to the seminal rap group of the same, er, acronym.)" was begun by Erick Bieritz in 2004 as a column of short reviews on singles and EPs and then taken over in 2005 by writer Kevin Alfoldy with a more narrative and anecdotal format.

Since 2000 LAS has published an influential Year-End Music Report with critical rankings of each year's most notable albums, and the magazine also publishes regular artist interviews, festival reports, political commentary, travel articles and reports on lifestyle and media trends.

In February 2001 the magazine began publishing the column "Sell Me To The Mayor" in collaboration with The 2nd Hand writing collective. That series ended with #23, a "SPECIAL WAR EDITION" on 20 March. Other columns of similarly varied content around the same time included the "Schmidt Conspiracy" and the "Female Intimacy Search Column" by Tom Schmidt.

February 2001 LAS published a transcript of an interview with Rolling Stone writer Christian Hoard, who was a "freelance writer working on an article for Salon" in which the publication stated that they "certainly do the same thing we are doing in a print format rather than online, but with far less interactivity and less content--the logistics of publishing a print magazine every Monday dwarf those of updating a website every Monday."

In 2002 the magazine published another interview transcript, with a woman named Lottie Wilson who was conducting research into "Globalization and Socialization's Effects on the Punk Sub-Culture," wherein the magazine identified the "demographic [they were] trying to appease" as "No one specific."

Beginning in 2005 LAS published an illustrated series of "Field Day" comics by artist Mike Shea in which "characters...led by the adventurous Ralph [included] Grandpa, Coach Ditry, and of course the Nozzlefuss, all at places like Yummy Tummy's." That series was followed in 2008 with another Shea comic, "Cash Rulez", a series of pages that "starts in 1993, when we are ten, and goes indefinitely" and show "an isolated event from one year in [the] rap career" of characters Dennis and Daniel. A reported "anthology form along with an album of audio recordings of some of the songs that appear within" has never materialized.

In 2009 LAS began publishing the "Missed the Boat" column by writer Dan Weiss with short mentions of notable music.

References

External links
LAS Magazine
LAS Last.FM page

Magazines established in 1998
Online music magazines published in the United States